The 2019–20 SEHA League season was the ninth season of the SEHA (South East Handball Association) League and sixth under the sponsorship of the Russian oil and gas company Gazprom. Twelve teams from nine countries (Belarus, Croatia, North Macedonia, Serbia, Slovakia, Hungary, Ukraine, Russia and China were participating in this year's competition. On 13 August the Executive Committee of the SEHA – Gazprom League has made a decision that because of the crucial disagreements over conditions regarding the participation in the 2019/20 season, Tatabánya will not participate in the SEHA – Gazprom League this season.

Vardar 1961 were defending champions.

Final four tournament was held at Krešimir Ćosić Hall in Zadar, Croatia, on 4 and September 2020. Telekom Veszprém defeated Vardar 1961 30–29 in the final to win their third title.

Competition format
Twelve teams, divided into two groups participated in the competition. Groups A and B were played with six teams each, in a round robin, home and away format. The top two teams in each group qualified directly for the quarter-finals, while the teams that finish the Group Phase in positions 3–6 played in the Play off phase.

Play off Phase

8 teams played home and away in the Play off phase, with the teams that finish the Group Phase in positions 3–6.

Quarter-finals

The four winners of the matches in the Play off phase, joined by the top two of Groups A and B, played home and away for the right to contest the SEHA Final 4.

SEHA Final 4

The culmination of the season, the SEHA Final 4, continues in its existing format, with the four top teams from the competition competing for the title over one weekend. The host and schedule for this year's Final Four tournament was announced on 25 February 2020.

Team information  
The SEHA – Gazprom League Executive Committee made decision that 12 participants will play in two groups in the upcoming season. Telekom Veszprem, Motor Zaporozhye, Eurofarm Pelister, Metaloplastika Sabac, HC Spartak Moscow and Beijing Sport University are the new clubs that will join the 9th SEHA – Gazprom League season.

Venues and locations 

Notes

1 Beijing Sport University will play all of their home matches in Zagreb, Croatia.

Personnel and kits
Following is the list of clubs competing in 2019–20 SEHA League, with their manager, team captain, kit manufacturer and shirt sponsor.

Coaching changes

Group phase  
In the Group Phase, each team played ten matches within their respective groups. Five matches were played at home, and five matches away. The final position after the ten rounds determined if a club will play in the Play off phase or if they will earn a direct placement to the quarterfinals phase.

Group A

Group B

Playoffs 
The Play off phase was made up of two matches for each participating team, one match played at home and one match played away. The teams that finished the Group Phase in positions 3–6 played in the Play off phase.

Overview

|}
Notes

1 Both legs were hosted by Meshkov Brest.

Matches

Tatran Prešov won 63–45 on aggregate.

Vojvodina won 51–48 on aggregate.

Nexe won 45–44 on aggregate.

Meshkov Brest won 87–49 on aggregate. won 45–44 on aggregate.Quarter-finals 
There will be eight teams competing in the quarter-finals phase. Four teams will have earned a direct placement after the Group Phase, and four additional teams will have earned a quarter-finals spot through the playoff phase.

The SEHA – Gazprom League’s commissioner on Friday 13 March 2020 has made a decision to postpone SEHA - Gazprom League Quarter final 2nd leg matches: Telekom Veszprem – Vojvodina (14 March 2020) and Vardar 1961 - Nexe (15 March 2020), due to the ongoing developments in the spread of COVID-19 across Europe. All further updates will be published accordingly.

Overview

|}

MatchesVardar 1961 won 56–56 on aggregate on away goals. HC Vojvodina has informed the SEHA – Gazprom League Board that due to epidemiological and transport issues which occurred in Serbia caused by the pandemic situation, they were not able to travel to Hungary, for the 2nd leg of the SEHA Quarter finals against Telekom Veszprém. SEHA - Gazprom League’s Commissioner regarding mentioned match, decided the game to be awarded 10–0 in favor of Telekom Veszprém, according to the League’s regulations.Telekom Veszprém won 41–26 on aggregate.Meshkov Brest won 63–56 on aggregate.PPD Zagreb won 53–37 on aggregate.''

Final Four 
The four winners of the quarter-final matches qualify for the right to contest the SEHA final four. The SEHA - Gazprom League Executive Committee had made the decision for the final four tournament to be held at the Krešimir Ćosić Hall in Zadar, Croatia, on 3 and 5 April 2020.
Due to the current situation in the spread of COVID-19 across Europe and further objective reasons, SEHA Executive Committee has made a decision to postpone the Final 4 indefinitely. All further updates will be published accordingly. On 11 August 2020 the SEHA - Gazprom League Executive Committee announced the decision for the final four tournament to be held at the Krešimir Ćosić Hall in Zadar, Croatia, on 4 and 6 September 2020.

Bracket

Semifinals

Match for third place

Final

Top goalscorers

Awards
The all-star team was announced on 6 September 2020.

Goalkeeper: 
Right wing: 
Right back: 
Centre back: 
Left back: 
Left wing: 
Pivot: 
Best Defender: 
MVP of the Final four:

References

External links 
 Official website

 
SEHA League
2019–20 domestic handball leagues
SEHA League